Steven Zuber (born 17 August 1991) is a Swiss professional footballer who plays as a winger for Greek Super League club AEK Athens and the Switzerland national team.

Early life
Steven Zuber was born on 17 August 1991 in Winterthur, Zürich, Switzerland to Walter and Susanne Zuber. He has five siblings: Melanie, Kevin, Severin, David, and Marvin. On 27 May 2015, he married his long-time girlfriend, Mirjana Vasović.

Club career

Grasshopper
Zuber made his first-team debut for Grasshopper on 12 July 2008 in the Intertoto Cup second round, second leg match against KS Besa, where he came on as an 83rd-minute substitute. On 3 August, he made his first Swiss Super League appearance in a 1–1 draw with Vaduz.

CSKA Moscow
On 5 July 2013, Zuber signed a five-year contract with Russian Premier League champions CSKA Moscow. He made his debut on 13 July against  Zenit St. Petersburg in the 2013 Russian Super Cup, which CSKA won 3–0. He made his league debut four days later against Ural.

Hoffenheim
On 14 August 2014, Zuber moved to 1899 Hoffenheim on a four-year deal. On 25 January 2017, he extended his contract until 2020.

VfB Stuttgart
On 9 January 2019, Zuber was loaned out to VfB Stuttgart until the end of the season.

Eintracht Frankfurt
On 4 August 2020, Zuber joined Bundesliga club Eintracht Frankfurt, with Mijat Gaćinović going the other way as part of a swap deal. He signed a 3-year contract.

AEK Athens
On 30 August 2021 he signed a long season contract with Superleague Greece club AEK Athens on loan from Eintracht Frankfurt. After 130 appearances in the German Bundesliga, Zuber moves to a new league for him after he has already played football in his home country and Russia. For the left midfielder, the Greek capital club will be the sixth in his professional career.

The deal between the two clubs includes a buy-out option in the region of €2,000,000, while Zuber will sign a three-year contract, should AEK choose to exercise it.

On 6 May 2022, AEK activated the buy-out clause of the Swiss player and along with that, the three-year contract was signed.

International career
A member of the 2007–08 Switzerland U-17 squad, he was named as a reserve for the UEFA U-17 Championship held in May 2008. Zuber was a member of the Switzerland national team that participated in the 2012 Summer Olympics in London. On 17 March 2017, he was called into camp for the Switzerland team.

He was included in the national team's 23-man squad for the 2018 FIFA World Cup in Russia. He started the first 2 group games against Brazil and Serbia, scoring the tying goal in a 1–1 draw with Brazil in their first group match. He started their round of 16 match against Sweden as they lost 1-0 and fell out of the tournament.

In May 2019, he played in 2019 UEFA Nations League Finals, where his team finished 4th.

Zuber was included in Switzerland's UEFA Euro 2020 squad. He played an important role in Switzerland's victory over France in the round of 16, providing an assist and winning a penalty. He also finished the tournament as the assist leader with 4.

Career statistics

Club

International

Scores and results list Switzerland's goal tally first.

Honours
Grasshopper
Swiss Cup: 2012–13

CSKA
Russian Premier League: 2013–14
Russian Super Cup: 2013, 2014

Individual
Swiss Cup Top goalscorer: 2010–11

References

External links

 Profile at the AEK Athens F.C. website

1991 births
Living people
People from Winterthur
Association football midfielders
Swiss men's footballers
Switzerland youth international footballers
Switzerland under-21 international footballers
Olympic footballers of Switzerland
Switzerland international footballers
FC Winterthur players
Grasshopper Club Zürich players
PFC CSKA Moscow players
TSG 1899 Hoffenheim players
TSG 1899 Hoffenheim II players
VfB Stuttgart players
Eintracht Frankfurt players
AEK Athens F.C. players
Swiss Super League players
Russian Premier League players
Bundesliga players
Regionalliga players
Super League Greece players
Footballers at the 2012 Summer Olympics
2018 FIFA World Cup players
UEFA Euro 2020 players
Swiss expatriate footballers
Expatriate footballers in Russia
Expatriate footballers in Germany
Expatriate footballers in Greece
Swiss expatriate sportspeople in Russia
Swiss expatriate sportspeople in Germany
Sportspeople from the canton of Zürich